The John P. and Kathrine G. McGovern Medical School, located in the Texas Medical Center in Houston, Texas, is the graduate medical school associated with the University of Texas Health Science Center at Houston (UTHealth Houston). Established by the Texas Legislature in 1969 as the University of Texas Medical School at Houston, the McGovern Medical School enrolled its first class of 19 students in 1970. Today, the school annually enrolls a class size of 240 students, making it the seventh-largest medical school in the United States.

History 
In 1968, the University of Texas Board of Regents signed an affiliation agreement with Hermann Hospital for the hospital to become the primary teaching facility for the proposed University of Texas Medical School at Houston. In 1969, the University of Texas Medical School at Houston was simultaneously authorized with the Texas Tech University School of Medicine by the Texas Legislature to address the projected state and national shortages of physicians.

In 1972, the school joins the newly formed University of Texas Health Science Center at Houston.

In 2010, the University of Texas System Board of Regents approves a dba for the University of Texas Health Science Center to operate under the name UTHealth. This results in the renaming of the UT Medical School at Houston to the UTHealth Medical School.

In 2015, the school received a $75 million donation from the John P. McGovern Foundation, the largest donation in the university's history. In honor of the gift, the UTHealth Medical School was renamed the John P. and Katherine G. McGovern Medical School.

Teaching Facilities 
McGovern Medical School provides faculty, residents, and students for Memorial Hermann-Texas Medical Center and Lyndon Baines Johnson General Hospital.  The clinical practice of the school is UT Physicians, one of the nation's largest multi-specialty medical practices.

References 

Medical schools in Texas
Educational institutions established in 1969
1969 establishments in Texas
University of Texas Health Science Center at Houston schools